A boundary commission is a legal entity that determines borders of nations, states, constituencies.

Notable boundary commissions have included:
 Afghan Boundary Commission, an Anglo-Russian Boundary Commission, of 1885 and 1893, delineated the northern frontier of Afghanistan.
 Anglo-Turkish Boundary Commission of 1902–1905, delineated the border between Yemen and the Aden Protectorate.
 Boundary commissions (United Kingdom) of the United Kingdom
 Boundary Commission (Ireland) between the United Kingdom and Ireland
 Boundary Commission (Pacific Northwest) of the Pacific Northwest
 Boundary Commission (Maine) of Maine
 Boundary Commission (Alaska Panhandle) of the Alaska Panhandle
 Boundary Commissions (Netherlands) of Indonesia
 Comisión de Límites, the Mexican Boundary Commission after the Adams–Onís Treaty
 International Boundary and Water Commission, for the US–Mexico border
 Canada–United States International Boundary Commission, for the Canada–US border
 Local Government Boundary Commission for England

References

Boundary commissions
Government commissions
Former disambiguation pages converted to set index articles